College of The Albemarle (COA) is a public community college in the Albemarle region of northeastern North Carolina. The main campus is in Elizabeth City with satellite campuses in Barco, Manteo and Edenton. Established on December 16, 1960, College of The Albemarle became the first institution of the North Carolina Community College System as chartered by the Community College Act of 1957.

Campuses

COA serves students from Camden, Chowan, Currituck, Dare, Gates, Pasquotank, and Perquimans counties.

 Elizabeth City (Main Campus)
 Dare County (Manteo)
 Edenton-Chowan
 Regional Aviation and Technical Training Center (Barco)

References

External links

Two-year colleges in the United States
North Carolina Community College System colleges
Universities and colleges accredited by the Southern Association of Colleges and Schools
Educational institutions established in 1960
Education in Pasquotank County, North Carolina
Education in Dare County, North Carolina
Education in Chowan County, North Carolina
Buildings and structures in Pasquotank County, North Carolina
Buildings and structures in Dare County, North Carolina
Buildings and structures in Chowan County, North Carolina
1960 establishments in North Carolina
Education in Currituck County, North Carolina